Andrea Palmisano (born 1 February 1988) is an Italian male rower, medal winner at senior level at the European Rowing Championships.

References

External links
 

1988 births
Living people
Italian male rowers
Rowers from Rome